The Public Libraries (Scotland) Act 1920 (10 & 11 Geo. V c. 45) was an Act of Parliament in the United Kingdom. It became law on 16 August 1920.

It amended the Public Libraries Consolidation (Scotland) Act 1887, providing that with effect from 15 May 1920, the rating limit under section 8 of that Act was increased from 1d to 3d.

See also
Public Libraries Act

References
Oliver & Boyd's new Edinburgh almanac and national repository for the year 1921. p228

United Kingdom Acts of Parliament 1920
Library law
1920 in Scotland
Public libraries in Scotland
Acts of the Parliament of the United Kingdom concerning Scotland